San Pablo Peninsula is a peninsula in western Richmond, between San Pablo Bay and San Rafael Bay, in southwestern Contra Costa County, California.

Geography
The peninsula runs between Castro Cove and Point San Pablo, and is dominated by the steep ridges of the Potrero Hills, an escarpment that runs along the entire peninsula. 

The peninsula is largely owned by Chevron and is used as a safety buffer for security purposes (see Chevron Richmond Refinery).

Features
Features located on San Pablo Peninsula include:
 Point Molate Beach Park
 Point Molate Regional Shoreline
 Point Molate Marsh
 Point San Pablo 
 Point San Pablo Yacht Harbor
 Winehaven

Notes

Peninsulas of California
Geography of Richmond, California
Landforms of Contra Costa County, California
Landforms of the San Francisco Bay Area
San Pablo Bay